Rocyan Fernando Santiago Mendonça (born 10 January 2000), known simply as Rocyan, is a Brazilian footballer who currently plays as a midfielder for Atlético Mineiro.

Career statistics

Club

Notes

References

2000 births
Living people
Brazilian footballers
Brazilian expatriate footballers
Association football midfielders
Grêmio Foot-Ball Porto Alegrense players
SC Austria Lustenau players
Austrian Football Bundesliga players
Brazilian expatriate sportspeople in Austria
Expatriate footballers in Austria